Clover Hill is an unincorporated community located in Coahoma County, Mississippi, United States. The community is located on the former plantation of J. T. Fargason. Clover Hill once had a depot on the former Yazoo and Mississippi Valley Railroad. A post office operated under the name Clover Hill from 1884 to 1935.

The Clover Hill archaeological site is named after the community.

References

Unincorporated communities in Coahoma County, Mississippi
Unincorporated communities in Mississippi